David Lynn Burnette (born March 24, 1961) is a former American football offensive tackle in the National Football League for the Dallas Cowboys. He played college football at the University of Central Arkansas.

Early years
Burnette attended Parkin High School, where he played football and basketball. He accepted a football scholarship from the University of Arkansas. He transferred after his sophomore season to the University of Central Arkansas, where he played as a defensive tackle.

As a junior, he posted 99 tackles (second on the team), 18 tackles for loss, 3 sacks and one pass breakup. As a senior, he registered 77 tackles (fifth on the team), 7 tackles for loss, 3 sacks and one blocked kick, while helping the school win its first NAIA national championship. 

He also practiced basketball. As a junior, he appeared in 13 games (3 starts), averaging 5.3 points and 3.7 rebounds per contest.

Professional career
Burnette was selected by the Indianapolis Colts in the 12th round (312th overall) of the 1985 NFL Draft. He was converted into an offensive tackle during training camp. He was waived on August 19.

On April 24, 1986, he was signed as a free agent by the New York Jets. He was cut before the start of the season.

In 1987, he signed as a free agent with the Atlanta Falcons. He was released on September 1.

After the NFLPA strike was declared on the third week of the 1987 season, those contests were canceled (reducing the 16 game season to 15) and the NFL decided that the games would be played with replacement players. In September, he was signed to be a part of the Dallas Cowboys replacement team that was given the mock name "Rhinestone Cowboys" by the media. He was the backup at left tackle behind Daryle Smith. He was released after the strike ended on October 20.

References

 
1961 births
Living people
People from Parkin, Arkansas
Players of American football from Arkansas
American football offensive tackles
Central Arkansas Bears football players
Arkansas Razorbacks football players
Dallas Cowboys players
National Football League replacement players
Basketball players from Arkansas
American men's basketball players
Central Arkansas Bears basketball players